Sebastian Schäfer (born 11 July 1979) is a German economist and politician of the Alliance 90/The Greens who has been serving as  member of the Bundestag since 2021.

Early life and education
Schäfer was born 1979 in the West German town of Dettelbach. He studied philosophy at the University of Erfurt and Beloit College, and economics at the University of California, Berkeley.

Early career
From 2018 to 2021, Schäfer worked at Baden-Württemberg's State Ministry of Finance. He was a 2021/22 Marshall Memorial Fellow of the German Marshall Fund.

Political career
In the negotiations to form a coalition government under the leadership of Minister-President of Baden-Württemberg Winfried Kretschmann following the 2021 state elections, Schäfer was part of the working group on the state budget, led by Edith Sitzmann and Stefanie Bürkle.

Schäfer was elected to the Bundestag in 2021. He has since been serving on the Budget Committee and the Finance Committee. In 2022, he also joined the parliamentary body charged with overseeing a 100 billion euro special fund to strengthen Germany's armed forces.

Other activities
 Nuclear Waste Disposal Fund (KENFO), Member of the Board of Trustees (since 2022)

References 

Living people
1979 births
People from Kitzingen (district)
Members of the Bundestag 2021–2025
21st-century German politicians
Alliance 90/The Greens politicians